Asociația Club Sportiv Minerul Uricani, commonly known as Minerul Uricani, is a Romanian  football club based in Uricani, Hunedoara County and currently playing in the Liga IV – Hunedoara County, the fourth tier of the Romanian football league system.

History
Minerul Uricani was founded in the summer of 1957 and for several decades played only in the regional and county championships.

In the 1986–87 season, managed by Dumitru Iacob, Minerul won the county championship for the first time, but failed the promotion losing 0–1 and 0–2 in the play-off match against Auto Timișoara, the champion of Timiș County.

At the end of 1989–90 season, with Dorel Maria as head coach, managed to promoted in Divizia C, after won the county championship and the promotion play-off against Minerul Oravița, the champion of Caraș-Severin County (3–0 at Uricani and 0–1 at Oravița). The squad included among others: Szilverster, Alecu, Irimuș, Ceacusta, Bățălan, Fazekaș, Feri Varga, Căuneac, Postelnicu, Alexandru Ion, Dulcu, Gîtan, Toma, Lumperdea.

Followed thirteen consecutive seasons in the third division being generally in the first part of the standings. The best results were obtained in the first season, 1990–91, when the club finished runners-up in the 8th series, followed by a 3rd place in 1991–92 season and 4th in two occasion, 1992–93 and 1993–94. In this period, Minerul, having in composition players such as: Popescu, Szilverster – Claudiu Roșca, Ștefanache, Irimuș, Orminișan, Hristea, V.Roșca, Lăcătușu, Neculai Băltaru, Vasile Scurtu, Dulcu, M.Topor.

In the 1994–95 season occupied the 6th place in the 4th series, with the coach Dorel Maria on the bench, in the team formula: Szilverster (Fane Munteanu) - Nicoară, Ștefănache (Irimuș), V. Roșca, Claudiu Roșca (Grecu) - M.Topor, Cristian Florescu (Bal), Sârghia, Szoradi - N. Iordache, I. Mureșan.

The team coached by Dorel Maria and Marian Mihai with players like: M. Topor, Szoradi, Cristian Florescu, Krautil, Ioan Varga, Florin Iordache or Viorel Păuna, finished on the 9th place in the 1995–96 season.

In the following third seasons, Minerul Uricani held position between 5 and 14th (1996–97 – 5th), (1997–98 – 14th), (1998–99 – 9th)

In 1999–2000 season, Minerul Uricani finished on the 9th place, with two coaches, Cristian Florescu (rounds 1–13) and Neculai Băltaru (rounds 14–34) with the players Vasile Scurtu (11 goals), Alin Farcaș, Anton Ilie, Irimuș, Hristea, Gigel Bană, Matache, Florin Iordache or Vali Pop.

After a 7th place in 2000–01 season, followed two weak seasons, 2001–02 - 15th, and 2002–03 - 14th, and "the miners" were relegated back to the county championship.

In the 2004–05 season, coached by Ioan Dosan, Minerul Uricani won the Divizia D – Hunedoara and returns to Divizia C  where it survives only two seasons: 2005–2006 - 8th place and 2006–07 - 17th place.

The next years were stagnant, with Minerul finishing in the first part of the league table, but having been unable to get out of the 4th Division.

In 2010–11 season, head coach Neculai Băltaru combining the experience of some players, such as Cornel Irina, Sansiro Ciocoi, Raul Cizmașiu, Viorel Mihăilescu or Remus Moldovan, with young players such as the goalkeeper Adrian Farcaș, Elian Preoteasa, Andrei Nistor, among others, managed a good season finishing on the 2nd place being a serious contender for Jiul Petroșani to promotion.

Since then, due to the economic decline, the club struggles to survive, playing football only at the level of the fourth league, with poor results, always finishing at the bottom of the standings.

Honours
Liga III
Runners-up (1): 1990–91
Liga IV – Hunedoara County
Winners (3): 1986–87, 1989–90, 2004–05
Runners-up (1): 2010–11

League history

References

External links
 FRF-AJF Profile

Football clubs in Hunedoara County
Liga III clubs
Liga IV clubs
Association football clubs established in 1957
Mining association football teams in Romania